Just Call Me Lonesome is an album by American country singer Ernest Tubb, released in 1963 (see 1963 in music).

Track listing
All songs by Rex Griffin unless otherwise noted.
"I Told You So" (Rex Griffin, Jimmie Davis)
"I Loved You Once" (Griffin, Davis)
"Just an Old Faded Photograph"
"Last Letter"
"If You Call That Gone Goodbye"
"How Can I Be Sure" (Griffin, Ernest Tubb)
"I'll Never Tell You I Love You"
"Beyond the Last Mile"
"Just Partners"
"I Think I'll Give Up (It's All Over)"
"I'm as Free as the Breeze" (Griffin, Tubb)
"Just Call Me Lonesome"

Personnel
Ernest Tubb – vocals, guitar
Johnny Johnson – guitar
Leon Rhodes – guitar
Grady Martin – guitar
Buddy Charleton – pedal steel guitar
Tommy Jackson – fiddle
Jack Drake – bass
Harold Bradley – bass
Bob Steele – drums
Jan Kurtis – drums
Floyd Cramer – piano

References

Ernest Tubb albums
1963 albums
Albums produced by Owen Bradley
Decca Records albums